Julian is an unincorporated community populated place on West Virginia Route 3 in Boone County, West Virginia, United States.  It is just west of U.S. Route 119.

Julian was named circa 1900 for Julian Hill, a prominent land owner of the area.  It was at one time known as Hill. Current population is 936.

The Little Coal River flows nearby.

References

Unincorporated communities in Boone County, West Virginia
Unincorporated communities in West Virginia
Charleston, West Virginia metropolitan area